Saint-Augustin is a commune in the Seine-et-Marne department in the Île-de-France region in north-central France.

Geography
The river Aubetin flows northward through the commune.

Demographics
Inhabitants of Saint-Augustin are called Saint-Augustinois.

See also
Communes of the Seine-et-Marne department

References

External links

1999 Land Use, from IAURIF (Institute for Urban Planning and Development of the Paris-Île-de-France région) 

Communes of Seine-et-Marne